Kan Kanda Deivam is a 1967 Indian Tamil-language drama film written and directed by K. S. Gopalakrishnan, and produced by Kamal Brothers. It stars S. V. Ranga Rao, Padmini, S. V. Subbaiah and Nagesh. The film was released on 15 September 1967 and emerged a commercial success. The film was remade in Telugu as Bandhavyalu (1968).

Plot 
Ranga Rao plays a widowed, well-respected, just and fair Landlord with a blind son while Subbaiah plays his brother. Innocent Subbaiah, along with his wife Padmini, their daughter and their three good-for-nothing sons depend on Ranga Rao for everything as he is the one who is aware of worldly ways. Living opposite them is Thevar and his brother Sivakumar with Thevar being a criminal and a smuggler while his brother played by Sivakumar hates him and leaves the house only to be employed by Ranga Rao as his servant. He is in love with the daughter.

Thevar manipulates the sons and through them, Subbaiah causing a wedge in the family while using the father and sons to collateral the huge bank loan that he owes in the guise of selling a car. Sensing the danger, Ranga Rao immediately calls for a partition separating all useless properties into one portion in the name of his younger brother while retaining all the good ones over to him to save them from being taken over by the bank. However, except for the sons, the village as well as Subbaiah still trusts Ranga Rao. Thevar them blemishes Ranga Rao through a girl who turns out to be a girl jilted by of the brothers through whom she has a child. Finally, Ranga Rao, using his worldly cleverness exposes Thevar's activity, retains all the property by getting Thevar to remove the collateral and then sends him to jail for his illegal activities reuniting the family.

Cast 
S. V. Ranga Rao as the landlord
Padmini as the landlord's sister-in-law
S. V. Subbaiah as the landlord's brother
Nagesh as the lawyer
V. Nagayya as Neighbour
O. A. K. Thevar as a criminal
 S.Rama Rao as Criminal assistant
Sivakumar as Servant
S. V. Sahasranamam as the judge
 Kallapart Natarajan as Elder Son
 Maharan as Middle Son
A. Veerappan as youngest son
 Vijayarani as daughter

Production 
Kan Kanda Deivam was directed by K. S. Gopalakrishnan and produced by Kamal Brothers. R. Sampath was the cinematographer and R. Devan was the editor. Some song sequences from the film were shot on an agricultural background. The final length of the film was 4845 metres.

Soundtrack 
The music was composed by K. V. Mahadevan, with lyrics by Udumalai Narayana Kavi and Vaali.

Release 
Kan Kanda Deivam was released on 15 September 1967, and was distributed by Jai Maruthi Combines. The film was critically and commercially successful, with Kalki appreciating Gopalakrishnan's direction and writing.

References

External links 
 

1960s Tamil-language films
1967 drama films
Films directed by K. S. Gopalakrishnan
Films scored by K. V. Mahadevan
Films with screenplays by K. S. Gopalakrishnan
Indian black-and-white films
Indian drama films
Tamil films remade in other languages